William Rees of Scoveston, Haverfordwest, was a solicitor who served as High Sheriff of Pembrokeshire in 1863. In 1857, he sought election as MP for Haverfordwest as a Liberal candidate and was defeated by a narrow majority of to votes.

Rees became a member of Haverfordwest Town Council in the 1830s and served as mayor on three occasions. He retired as alderman a year before his death.

Rees died in 1874.

References

1874 deaths
Year of birth missing
High Sheriffs of Pembrokeshire
Welsh solicitors
People from Haverfordwest
Liberal Party (UK) parliamentary candidates
Mayors of places in Wales